Nessaea is a genus of nymphalid butterflies found in the Neotropical realm. Unlike virtually all other butterflies with blue coloration, the blue colors in this genus are due to pigmentation [pterobilin (biliverdin IXγ)] rather than iridescence (e.g., Morpho species).

Species
Accepted species:
Nessaea aglaura Doubleday [1848] – common olivewing, northern nessaea or Aglaura olivewing
Nessaea ecuadorensis Talbot 1932
Nessaea batesii C. & R. Felder 1860 – Bates olivewing
Nessaea magniplaga Röber 1928
Nessaea hewitsonii C. & R. Felder 1859 – Hewitson's olivewing
Nessaea obrinus Linnaeus 1758 – obrina olivewing
Nessaea faventia Fruhstorfer 1910
Nessaea latifascia Röber 1928
Nessaea romani Bryk 1953
Nessaea regina Salvin 1869
Nessaea thalia Bargmann 1928

Unaccepted species:
Nessaea margaretha Krüger 1933 - unavailable name and infrasubspecific name
Nessaea ancaeus Linnaeus 1767 - junior subjective synonym
Nessaea lesoudieri Le Moult 1933 - junior subjective synonym
Nessaea coniuncta Krüger 1933 - unavailable name and infrasubspecific name

Images

References
Vane-Wright, R.I. 1979. The coloration, identification and phylogeny of Nessaea butterflies (Lepidoptera: Nymphalidae). Bulletin of the British Museum (Natural History), Entomology, 38: 27–56.

External links 

Images representing Nessaea at Encyclopedia of Life 
"Nessaea Hübner, [1819]" at Markku Savela's Lepidoptera and Some Other Life Forms

Biblidinae
Nymphalidae of South America
Taxa named by Jacob Hübner
Nymphalidae genera